Io is a village in Alver municipality, in Vestland county, Norway.

See also
List of short place names

References

Alver (municipality)
Villages in Vestland